Sandra Voitāne (born 16 September 1999) is a Latvian football striker who plays for Keflavík in the Úrvalsdeild kvenna.

Club career

Rīgas FS

Apollon Ladies
Voitāne joined Cypriot First Division club Apollon Ladies in July 2019, and scored five goals in her first 14 appearances.

SV Meppen
In August 2020, Voitāne joined SV Meppen, becoming the first Latvian to play in the Frauen-Bundesliga. She made her debut on 13 September 2020, as a substitute coming on at the end of the match against Turbine Potsdam. Altogether, she played six matches for the club during the 2020–21 season.

Wacker Innsbruck
In June 2021, Voitāne joined Austrian club Wacker Innsbruck.

International career
Voitāne debuted for the Latvia senior national team in February 2015, at the age of 15 years old. With the national squad, she has twice won the Baltic Cup.

International goals

References

External links 
 

1999 births
Living people
Latvian women's footballers
Women's association football forwards
Apollon Ladies F.C. players
Rīgas FS players
Latvia women's youth international footballers
Latvia women's international footballers